Worrell Mill Swamp is a  long 2nd order tributary to the Meherrin River in Hertford County, North Carolina.  This is the only stream of this name in the United States.

Course
Worrell Mill Swamp begins at the dam of Worrell Millpond in Murfreesboro, North Carolina, and then flows northeast to join the Meherrin River on the northeast side of Murfreesboro.

Watershed
Worrell Mill Swamp drains  of area, receives about 48.3 in/year of precipitation, has a wetness index of 509.68, and is about 28% forested.

See also
List of rivers of North Carolina

References

Rivers of North Carolina
Rivers of Hertford County, North Carolina